Anotopterus vorax, the south ocean daggertooth, is a species of daggertooth.  A. vorax inhabits the South Pacific, South Atlantic, South Indian Ocean, and Antarctic Ocean.

References
 Anotopterus vorax at Fishbase

Anotopteridae
Fish described in 1913